Georgiy Vasilyevich Kolnootchenko (born 7 May 1959) is a retired discus thrower from Belarus, who still is the national record holder with a distance of 69.44, thrown on 3 July 1982 in Indianapolis, United States. He won the silver medal in the men's discus event at the 1986 European Championships in Stuttgart, West Germany.

Achievements

References
AllTimeRanking

Belarusian male discus throwers
Soviet male discus throwers
1959 births
Living people
Place of birth missing (living people)
European Athletics Championships medalists